Austen is a masculine given name deriving from the Latin Augustine or August.

Notable people with the name
Austen Albu (1903–1994), British politician
Austen Angell (1933–2021), Australian chemist
Austen Campbell (1901–1981), English footballer
Austen Cargill (1887–1957), American businessman
Austen S. Cargill II (born 1951), American businessman
Austen Chamberlain (1863–1937), British statesman
Austen Cowper (1885–1960), South African cricketer
Austen Robin Crapp (born 1934), Australian prelate
Austen Crehore (1893–1962), American pilot
Austen Croom-Johnson (1909–1964), English pianist
Austen Deans (1915–2011), New Zealand painter
Austen George Fox (1849–1937), American lawyer
Austen Gittos (1923–1986), New Zealand fencer
Austen Harrison (1891–1976), British architect
Austen Hudson (1894–1970), British politician
Austen Ivereigh (born 1966), British author
Austen Kark (1926–2002), British media manager
Austen King (born 1990), American soccer player
Austen Lane (born 1987), American football player
Austen Lake (1895–1964), American author
Austen Henry Layard (1817–1894), English art historian
Austen Pleasants (born 1997), American football player
Austen Fox Riggs (1876–1940), American psychiatrist
Austen Rowland (born 1981), American basketball player
Austen Schauer, American politician
Austen Smith (born 2001), American sports shooter
Austen Tayshus (born 1954), Australian comedian
Austen Williams (born 1992), American baseball player

See also
Austen (surname), a page for people with the surname Austen
Austin (given name), a page for people with the given name Austin
Austin (surname), a page for people with the surname Austin

Notes

English masculine given names